Govind Namdev (born 3 September 1954) is an Indian actor who appears in Hindi films. Namdev made his debut as a corrupt cop in David Dhawan's Shola Aur Shabnam (1992). He has acted in numerous movies, often as a villain. He is an alumnus of the National School of Drama 1977. After that he joined NSD repertory company and worked there 12–13 years as an actor.

Some of his most notable work has been in films like Oh My God, Dum Maro Dum, Bandit Queen, Virasat, Satya, Kachche Dhaage, Mast, Thakshak, Phir Bhi Dil Hai Hindustani, Pukar, Raju Chacha, Sarfarosh, Satta, Qayamat and Main Madhuri Dixit Banna Chahti Hoon, Johny Gadhaar. He will be starring in the upcoming Bollywood film Kaashi in Search of Ganga.

Film 

 *Saudagar (1991)
 *Shola Aur Shabnam (1992)
 *Chamatkar (1992)
 *Sardar (1994)  Shankar, Sardar Patel's assistant
 *Aankhen (1993)
 *Andaz (1994)
 *Bandit Queen (1994)
 *Prem (1995)
 *Prem Granth (1996)
 *Virasat (1997)
 *Zor (1998)
 *Satya (1998)
 *Sarfarosh (1999)
 *Mast  (1999)
 *Thakshak (1999)
 *Phir Bhi Dil Hai Hindustani (2000)
 *Pukar (2000)
 *Raju Chacha (2000)
 *Dr. Babasaheb Ambedkar (2000)  Subedar Ramji Maloji Sakpal, B. R. Ambedkar's father
 *Lajja (2001)
 *Badhaai Ho Badhaai (2002)
 *Kuch Tum Kaho Kuch Hum Kahein (2002)
 *Dil Hai Tumhaara (2002)
 *Pyaasa (2002)
 *Dum (2003)
 *Satta (2003)
 *Qayamat (2003)
 *Garv: Pride and Honour (2004)
 *Gayab (2004)
 *Ab Tumhare Hawale Watan Saathiyo (2004)
 *Chaahat - Ek Nasha (2005)
 *Nigehbaan - The Third Eye (2005)
 *Ramji Londonwaley (2005)
 *Ankush - The Command (2006)
 *Kachchi Sadak (2006)
 *Johnny Gaddaar (2007)
 *Kuchh Khel Kuchh Masti (2007)
 *Yuvvraaj (2008)
 *Nepali (2008)
 *Sarkar Raj (2008)
 *Memsahab - Lost In A Mirage (2008)
 *Khallballi - Fun Unlimited (2008)
 *Kusar Prasad Ka Bhoot (2009)
 *The White Land (2009)
 *Prateeksha (2009)
 *Tumhare Liye (2009)
 *Kabootar (2009)
 *Wanted (2009)
 *Jaane Bhi Do Yaron (2009)
 *Ajab Prem Ki Ghazab Kahani (2009)
 *Dum Maaro Dum (2011)
 *Singham (2011)
 *Ammaa Ki Boli (2012)
 *Jeena Hai Toh Thok Daal (2012)
 *Heroine (2012)
 *OMG – Oh My God! (2012)  Siddheswar Maharaj
 *Ata Pata Laapata (2012)
 *Janta V/S Janardan - Bechara Aam Aadmi (2013)
 *Ramaiya Vastavaiya (2013)  Zamindar Jaiswal
 *Boss (2013)
 *Spark (2014 film) (2014)
 *Singham Returns (2014)
 *Ab Tak Chhappan 2(2015)
 *Main Gabbar (2015)
 *JD (2016) as Divakar Verma
 *Anna (2016)
 *Vekh Baraatan Challiyan (Punjabi movie)
 *Shaadi Mein Zaroor Aana (2017)  Mr. Shukla, Aarti's father
 *Kashi - In search of Ganga as Balwant Pandey (2018)
 *Kashi to Kashmir -  (Upcoming)
 *Dassehra as Chief Minister Prasadi Lal (2018)
 *Sur Sapata Marathi Film as School Teacher (2019)
 *Jhalki (2019)
 * Officer Arjun Singh IPS Batch 2000 (2019)
 *Radhe (2021)  Senior Police Officer
 *Ek Nashebaaz (2022)  Rehabilitation house director
 *Decent Boy (2022)
 *Bhool Bhulaiyaa 2 (2022)
 *Ramrajya  Lucky's Guruji

Television 
 Parivartan  Hasmukh Ajmera
 Byomkesh Bakshi (Episode: Kiley Ka Rahasya) (1993)  Ramkishore Singh 
 Aahat (Season 1) 1995-2001 Episode 6: Tumhari Julia (1995)  Gomes and Episode 20-21 Gambler (1995) as Atul 
 Mahayagya (1997–98)  Chhote Thakur
 Aashirwad (1998-2001)  Purushottam Choudhary 
 Abhimaan (1999-00)  Police Commissioner
 Your Honour (2000)
 Tales of Lamaas (2020)

Awards
 1999: Screen Award for Best Actor (Television) - Mahayagya
 1999: Nominated: Filmfare Best Villain Award for Satya
 2009: Kabootar: Best Actor at the Osian's Film Fan
Screen Award for Best Performance Of the Year-Negative (Male)
Osian Cine Fan International Award for Best Actor in 2012
Maharashtra Kala Niketan Film Award
RAPA Award for Best Performance Male
Madhya Pradesh Ratna

References

External links

 
Govind Namdeo back with Johnny Gaddar
Govind Namdev Acts In Marathi Film For The First Time In His Career 

Living people
Indian male film actors
Male actors from Mumbai
Male actors in Hindi cinema
Indian male television actors
20th-century Indian male actors
21st-century Indian male actors
1954 births